Flanagan is a village in Livingston County, Illinois, United States. The population was 1,110 at the 2010 census.

Geography
Illinois Route 116 passes along the southern edge of the village, leading east  to Pontiac, the county seat, and west  to Woodford.

A small man-made lake (originally four separate lakes, some being filled in), called the Legion Lake, is located on the west side of the village. A walking trail surrounds it and a park shelter is located on the site. Artesian Park, another small park within the village boundaries, is located on the east side of town. It boasts two picnic shelters, a tennis court and playground equipment. A small business district of roughly one block in length is located in the center of town. Just north of this, the Flanagan Co-op can be found, a complex of several grain elevators and silos at Main and Lumber streets.

Demographics

As of the census of 2010, there were 1,110 people, 446 occupied households, and 278 families residing in the village. The racial makeup of the village was 97.7% White, 0.8% African American, 0.7% Asian, 0.2% from other races, and 0.5% from two or more races. Hispanic or Latino of any race were 1.8% of the population.

There were 446 households, out of which 26.2% had children under the age of 18 living with them, 50.2% were married couples living together, 9.2% had a female householder with no husband present, and 37.7% were non-families. 32.1% of all households were made up of individuals, and 18.4% had someone living alone who was 65 years of age or older. The average household size was 2.28 and the average family size was 2.88.

In the village, the population was spread out, with 22.5% under the age of 18, 5.7% from 18 to 24, 23.5% from 25 to 44, 21.8% from 45 to 64, and 26.5% who were 65 years of age or older. The median age was 45.3 years. For every 100 females there were 84.2 males. For every 100 females age 18 and over, there were 78.1 males.

The median income for a household in the village was $39,479, and the median income for a family was $49,167. Males had a median income of $30,875 versus $21,359 for females. The per capita income for the village was $19,767. About 2.6% of families and 4.9% of the population were below the poverty line, including 4.6% of those under age 18 and 9.6% of those age 65 or over.

Notable people
Jeff Gundy, poet

References

External links
Village of Flanagan official website

Villages in Livingston County, Illinois